"The Little People of Killany Woods" is the second segment of the fourteenth episode from the first season (1985–86) of the television series The Twilight Zone. Set in Ireland, in this segment a resident of a small town stalks a local who has been spending gold he claims to have acquired from leprechauns.

Plot
Liam O'Shaughnessy is the pariah of a small Irish town due to his incessant mooching and fabricating of tall tales. He enters the local pub, tells everyone he saw the little people in Killany Woods, and is thrown out. Angered, he vows to return to the little people and remain with them.

Not long after, Mike Mulvaney sees Liam emerge from the hardware store holding a box. Mike questions the store owner about it, and is told the "little people" gave Liam gold to pay for tools to help them. Mike also discovers Liam has paid up his landlady and moved out.

When Mike confronts Liam, berating him for not paying off his numerous debts when he clearly has money, Liam admits he is a moocher but says he cannot pay anyone back because the money belongs to the little people and was only entrusted to him so he could buy the things they need. Mike does not believe him and uses the threat of force to make Liam hand over a triangular gold piece to cover his debt to Mike, even after Liam warns him that gold stolen from the little people will not remain good. When Mike demands the rest of the gold, Liam hits him over the head with the box and runs into the woods. Mike follows him and discovers the "little people" are actually small-statured aliens who arrived in a mushroom shaped spaceship. Mike runs back to town and tells everyone at the pub what he saw, but no one is inclined to believe his story, especially after the gold piece he flourishes turns out to be ordinary lead. Meanwhile, Liam departs with the aliens to their home planet.

Production
J. D. Feigelson wrote the story and teleplay, which were heavily inspired by The Informer, one of Feigelson's favorite films. The story editors liked the script, but the network rejected it, saying that it was too ethnic and whimsical. When the show suffered from a shortage of completed scripts later in the season, the story editors made a renewed push to get "The Little People of Killany Woods" produced, and the network relented.

Hamilton Camp came to the studio to audition for the part of the bartender, but upon seeing him The Twilight Zone crew immediately felt he might be right for the lead role of Liam O'Shaughnessey, which they had been having trouble casting, and asked him to read for that part. A different actress was originally cast in the part of Mrs. Finnegan, but dropped out at the last minute and was replaced by Pat Crawford Brown.

The exterior shots of the town and the scenes in Killany Woods were filmed at the Columbia Ranch. Liam's dance underneath the space ship was taken from the character Howard's dance in The Treasure of the Sierra Madre.

See also
 Hocus-Pocus and Frisby, an episode of the original The Twilight Zone which likewise features a man who tells tall tales being abducted by aliens

References

External links
 

The Twilight Zone (1985 TV series season 1) episodes
1986 American television episodes
Television episodes about alien visitations
Television episodes set in Ireland

fr:Les Petits Hommes verts (La Cinquième Dimension)